The Shire of Pine Rivers was a local government area about  north of Brisbane in the Moreton Bay region of South East Queensland, Australia.

The suburbs formerly within Pine Rivers are generally regarded as part of Greater Brisbane, both in a planning context and for statistical purposes.

Geography
The Shire is named for three rivers contained within it: the Pine River, which empties into Bramble Bay, and its tributaries, the North Pine River and South Pine River. Two large artificial reservoirs, Lake Samsonvale and Lake Kurwongbah, formed its centre. The western half of the shire consisted of the sparsely populated foothills of the D'Aguilar Range, the land being mostly forested or used for grazing cattle and horses. Hays Inlet and Saltwater Creek formed the eastern boundary of the Shire, beyond which lay the City of Redcliffe.

The main population concentration was in the east and southeast of the shire—the western part, which covered 76% of the shire's land area, contained only 18,309 residents in 2006. The key centres of population were Strathpine, which formed a mini-CBD for the area; Petrie and Kallangur further to the north, and Albany Creek and the Hills District closer to Brisbane's boundary. A new area based around North Lakes in the shire's northeast had also become reasonably established.

History

Area history
The area was settled by homestead farmers in the mid 19th century.  Many suburbs – Lawnton, Petrie, Griffin and Joyner, for example – are named after early European settlers.  The first township in the area was established at what is now Petrie in 1868, to service mail coaches between Brisbane and Gympie.  The Caboolture railway line reached the shire in 1888. Another railway line to Dayboro, in the western, mountainous areas of the shire was opened in 1920, but due to lack of traffic was closed and lifted in 1955.

During the Second World War, large areas of flat land around Brendale and Strathpine were used by Allied forces as airfields and staging areas.  It is estimated that around 50,000 Allied servicemen passed through the area, at a time when the civilian population was less than 5000.

Local government history

Caboolture Division was created on 11 November 1879 as one of 74 divisions around Queensland under the Divisional Boards Act 1879. It was centred on Caboolture, which was at that time a small logging town, and initially covered all of Moreton Bay and much of the Sunshine Coast. On 21 January 1888, the Pine Division split away from the Caboolture Division to become a separate local government area operating under the Divisional Boards Act 1887. Its first divisional board meeting was held on 7 March 1888 at the residence of Henry Thomas Ireland at Albany Creek Mr Ireland was unanimously elected as the board chairman for the year.

The meetings of the divisional board were held in rented premises at Bald Hill until a meeting hall and office building (now the heritage-listed "Old Shire Hall") was constructed in Strathpine in 1889.

In 1897, parts of the Parishes of Samsonvale, Pine and Whiteside were included in the Pine Division.

Following the passage of the Local Authorities Act 1902, Pine Division became the Shire of Pine on 31 March 1903. It underwent significant changes in 1921 and 1955, and on 23 May 1959, the Shire of Pine was renamed Shire of Pine Rivers. In March 1960, Council Meetings moved from the original weatherboard Shire Hall to new brick Council Chambers.It then remained with the same name and boundaries for almost 50 years.

On 15 March 2008, under the Local Government (Reform Implementation) Act 2007 passed by the Parliament of Queensland on 10 August 2007, the Shire of Pine Rivers amalgamated with the Shire of Caboolture and the City of Redcliffe to form the Moreton Bay Region. The Local Government Reform Commission's reasoning was that it would unite all of Brisbane's northern suburbs beyond the Brisbane City boundary into one local government area which would, in its view, simplify and streamline planning, approvals and governance.

Chairmen and mayors

The chairmen and mayors of the division and the shire were:

 1888 Henry Thomas Ireland
 1889 Robert Leitch
 1890 Andrew Bell 
 1891 George Biggs 
 1892 William Fogg
 1893–1894 Henry Thomas Ireland
 1895–1896 George Biggs
 1897 William Fogg
 1898 John Leitch
 1899 Charles Chilton
 1900 John Leitch
 1901 Charles Chilton
 1902 George Biggs
 1903 John Leitch
 1904 Charles Thomas Williams
 1905 Thomas Gardiner
 1906 Patrick Fahey
 1907 Edmund Page
 1908 Thomas Gardiner
 1909 William Johnston
 1910 John Gilliland 
 1911 Alexander McNeven
 1912 James Alexander Mecklem
 1913 William Bradley junior
 1914 Charles Edward Nicholas
 1915–1917 William John Smith
 1918 John Gilliland
 1919 Robert Morrison
 1920 William John Smith
 1921–1927 William Bradley junior
 1927–1930 Robert Morrison
 1930–1933 Robert Thomas Bradley
 1933–1950 William John Smith
 1950–1973 John Sanders Bray
 1973–1982 Leslie Edgar Hughes
 1982–1985 Allan James Hughes
 1985–1994 Robert George Akers 
 1994–2008 Yvonne Ann Chapman

In 1993, the Local Government Act Number 70 was introduced; it included that all heads of local government councils should be known as mayors and all other elected representatives were to be known as councillors. Thus Yvonne Chapman was both the first female leader of the council and its only mayor.

Other notable council members include:
 1973—1979: Joe Kruger, Member of the Queensland Legislative Assembly for Murrumba

Wards 
In its final years, the Shire of Pine Rivers was split up into 10 divisions, each electing one councillor to the Shire Council for a four-year term. Additionally, a mayor was elected to represent the entire Shire.

Division 1 – Dayboro and most of the rural area of the Shire
Division 2 – Ferny Hills, Samford Valley, Arana Hills
Division 3 – the 'Hills' area (Ferny Hills, Everton Hills)
Division 4 – Contains Albany Creek and Eatons Hill
Division 5 – Contains Warner, Cashmere
Division 6 – Contains Brendale, Central Strathpine
Division 7 – Contains Bray Park, Strathpine West, Lawnton South
Division 8 – Contains Joyner, Lawnton, Petrie, Whiteside
Division 9 – Contains Kurwongbah, Kallangur
Division 10 – Contains North Lakes, Griffin, Murrumba Downs

Suburbs
The Shire of Pine Rivers included the following suburbs:

Urban suburbs

 Albany Creek
 Arana Hills
 Bray Park
 BrendaleU1
 Eatons Hill
 Everton Hills
 Ferny Hills
 Griffin

 Kallangur
 Lawnton
 Mango Hill
 Murrumba Downs
 North LakesU2
 PetrieU3
 StrathpineU4
 Warner

U1 – light industrial area
U2 – newest suburb in the Shire
U3 – earliest township in the Shire
U4 – Shire council offices and Westfield Strathpine

Rural localities 

 Armstrong Creek
 Bunya
 Camp Mountain
 Cashmere
 Cedar Creek
 Clear Mountain
 Closeburn
 DakabinR1
 DayboroR2
 Draper
 Highvale
 Jollys Lookout
 Joyner
 King Scrub
 Kobble Creek

 Kurwongbah
 Laceys Creek
 Mount Glorious
 Mount Nebo
 Mount Pleasant
 Mount Samson
 Ocean View
 Rush Creek
 Samford Valley
 Samford VillageR2
 Samsonvale
 Whiteside
 Wights Mountain
 Yugar

R1 – contained the shire's major landfill, and Alma Park Zoo
R2 – village and tourist centre

Population

References

Further reading

External links
 
 
 Tourism Pine Rivers

 
Former local government areas of Queensland
1888 establishments in Australia
2008 disestablishments in Australia
Populated places disestablished in 2008